Si Phyo (born Si Phyo Htun 4 September 1990) is a Burmese actor. He is best known for his leading roles in several Burmese films. Throughout his career, he has acted in over 200 films.

Early life
Si Phyo was born on September 4, 1990 in  Pathein, Ayeyarwady Region, Myanmar to parent Htun Aung and Thi Thi Win. He is the eldest of two siblings.  His brother's name is Pyae Phyo Aung.  Si Phyo is also the nephew of astrologer Daw Swe Swe Win (ET).

Career
In 2012, he started his career by starring in his debut film Ywar Pyuk Gyi alongside Wyne Su Khine Thein. In the same year, he starred in film Chit Thu Eain alongside Soe Pyae Thazin and May Thet Khine. An then he acted in many film with different actresses.

In 2018, he starred in big screen film Killing Field alongside Min Thway, Nay Ye and Htoo Char. In 2019, he starred in big screen Lay Par Kyawt Shein Warazain alongside Min Maw Kun, Htun Htun, Nay Min, Min Thway, Paing Phyo Thu, Shwe Thamee and Than Thar Moe Theint. The same year, he starred in action-drama series A Lin Htae Ka Lu alongside Mone and San Toe Naing.

Business
 Happy Pages - Snack & Stationery
 Boombox Recording Studio
 Rasta Myanmar
 Mae Sot Taste Authentic Thai Food
E Thi Gems and Jewels

Filmography

Film

Film (Cinema)

Television series

References

External links

Living people
1990 births
Burmese male film actors
21st-century Burmese male actors